Jaegeria is a genus of flowering plants in the family Asteraceae found from Mexico to South America. The name commemorates Georg Friedrich von Jaeger.

 Species
 Jaegeria axillaris S.F.Blake - Colombia
 Jaegeria bellidiflora (Moc. & Sessé ex DC.) A.M.Torres & Beaman - Mexico (Michoacán, Puebla, México State, D.F., Hidalgo)
 Jaegeria glabra (S.Watson) B.L.Rob. - Mexico (Chihuahua, Durango, Guanajuato, Jalisco, Michoacán, Nayarit, México State, Querétaro)
 Jaegeria gracilis Hook.f. - Ecuador including Galápagos
 Jaegeria hirta (Lag.) Less. - widespread from Mexico (Chihuahua) to Uruguay
 Jaegeria macrocephala Less. - Mexico (Veracruz, México State, Michoacán, Nayarit,  Jalisco
 Jaegeria pedunculata Hook. & Arn. - Mexico (Michoacán, Nayarit,  Jalisco)
 Jaegeria purpurascens B.L.Rob. - Mexico (Durango)
 Jaegeria standleyi (Steyerm.) B.L.Turner - Mexico (Chiapas), Guatemala
 Jaegeria sterilis McVaugh - Mexico (Jalisco)

 Former species
Several species were once considered as belonging to Jaegeria but have now been re-classified into other genera such as Acmella, Galinsoga, Guizotia, or  Sphagneticola.

References

Asteraceae genera
Millerieae